This is an episode list for Kevin Sullivan's Road to Avonlea. The series began airing on CBC on January 7, 1990 in Canada, and on March 5, 1990 on The Disney Channel in the United States. It ran for seven seasons and ended on March 31, 1996. The final episode total is 91. All seven seasons have been released on DVD.

Series overview

Episodes

Season 1 (1990)

Season 2 (1990–91)

Season 3 (1992)

Season 4 (1993)

Season 5 (1994)

Season 6 (1995)

Season 7 (1996)

Special (1998)

Home releases

References

External links
 

Road to Avonlea
Lists of Disney Channel television series episodes